Atelanthera is a genus of flowering plants belonging to the family Brassicaceae.

Its native range is Central Asia to Western Himalaya.

Species:

Atelanthera perpusilla

References

Brassicaceae
Brassicaceae genera